Connor Moore (born 8 July 2003) is a rugby league footballer who plays as a  for the Newcastle Thunder in the RFL Championship, on loan from Hull Kingston Rovers in the Betfred Super League.

In 2022 he made his Hull KR Super League début against the Wigan Warriors.

References

External links
Hull KR profile

2003 births
Living people
English rugby league players
Hull Kingston Rovers players
Hunslet R.L.F.C. players
Newcastle Thunder players
Rugby league props
Rugby league players from Leeds